The 1925 Klass I season was the third season of the Klass I, the top level of ice hockey in Sweden. IK Göta won the league championship, finishing undefeated.

Final standings

External links
1925 season

1
Swedish
Klass I seasons